An Introduction to Karl Marx is a 1986 book about the philosopher Karl Marx by the social and political theorist Jon Elster. It is a much shorter version (about one-fourth in length) of Elster's Making Sense of Marx, published a year earlier.

Elster also edited a companion volume of selected writings by Marx, organizing along thematic lines corresponding to the book's chapters 2–9, on the topics of Marxian methodology, alienation, Marxian economics, exploitation, historical materialism, class consciousness and class struggle, Marx's theory of politics, and the Marxist critique of ideology.


Reception
The political scientist David McLellan praised the work for its rigor and accessibility.

References

Footnotes

Bibliography

 

1986 non-fiction books
Books about Karl Marx
Books by Jon Elster
English-language books
Rational choice theory